Manifesto is a music venue located at the Holenweg in Hoorn. The venue opened in 1999 and replaced the closed youth center Troll. The location has a total capacity of 350 people. The location has two different stages, namely the hall and the café. The hall has a capacity of 300 people and the café has a capacity of 50 people.

Some noteworthy artists who have performed at this location are The Pretty Things, Mick Taylor, Russkaja, The Charm The Fury and Chef'Special. There are also often performances by local, regional and upcoming artists.

References

External links
 Official Website

Music venues in the Netherlands
Music venues completed in 1999
1999 establishments in the Netherlands
Hoorn
Buildings and structures in North Holland
20th-century architecture in the Netherlands